Tasmania is the eighth studio album by Australian psychedelic rock band Pond. It was released on 1 March 2019 by Spinning Top Records via Caroline Australia (Interscope Records internationally). As with previous Pond albums, it is also produced by former member and Tame Impala frontman Kevin Parker. It features 10 tracks, led by third single "Daisy".

At the AIR Awards of 2020, the album was nominated for Best Independent Rock Album or EP.

Background
Tasmania has been called a "sister album" to the band's previous record, 2017's The Weather. It was recorded in Fremantle, Western Australia.

Concept
Tasmania, much like the band's previous release, The Weather, is a concept album that continues exploring certain themes and topics touched on in that record. In a statement, the band called the album a "dejected meditation on planetary discord, water, machismo, shame, blame and responsibility, love, blood and empire". In addition, the band also stated that the album "coats an undercurrent of restless, anxious dread in a sheen of light, apathetic content - both real and parody - rather than wallowing in self-pity, encouraging us to celebrate the fruits of our planet, frolic in the ocean, kick up the dust, roll in the grass and enjoy the feeling of being in love - while we still can."

Singles
"Burnt Out Star" and "Sixteen Days" were released in 2018 as the first two tracks from the album, released on 23 July and 5 October respectively. The third single, "Daisy", released on 10 January 2019, was noted for featuring "seductive changeups and dance-worthy delivery" by Paste magazine. A promo video for the title track, "Tasmania", was released to YouTube on 1 March 2019 to coincide with the album's release. Music videos for "The Boys Are Killing Me" and "Hand Mouth Dancer" were also uploaded to YouTube later in the year.

Critical reception

Tasmania received generally positive reviews from critics. At Metacritic, which assigns a normalized rating out of 100 to reviews from mainstream publications, the album received an average score of 77, based on fourteen reviews. Mark Deming gave a positive review for AllMusic, claiming " the music is effective and satisfying regardless of the level of quirkiness (they have a consistently strong talent for cutting a potent groove), and they make their eccentricities work in their favor rather than just boosting their "interesting" quotient."

Track listing

Personnel
Pond
 Nick Allbrook
 Jay Watson
 Joe Ryan
 Jamie Terry
 James Ireland

Additional musicians
 Francesca Mountfort – cello on "Daisy"
 Joey Waronker – drums  on "Tasmania" starting at 3:04
 Lucy Jack – additional vocals on "Burnt Out Star"
 Tristan Parr – cello on "Selené"
 Jonathan Wilson – guitar on "Selené"
 Benjamin Witt – guitar solo on "Shame"
 Kevin Parker – drums on "Doctor's In"

Production
 Production – Kevin Parker & Pond
 Mixing – Kevin Parker & Pond
 Engineering – Kevin Parker & Pond
 Mastering – Joe Carra
 Additional engineering on "Selené" – Sam Ford
 Artwork – They make it in the basement.

Charts

References

2019 albums
Pond (Australian band) albums